Eighteen Oddities in Yunnan (Chinese: 云南十八怪; pinyin: Yúnnán Shíbā Guài; sometimes called Eighteen Wonders of Yunnan) are eighteen unique traits of the Yunnan province of southwest China. The oddities, which are as follows, are generally presented in the form of a list, which is promulgated in promotional materials advertising the province to foreign and domestic tourists.

Eggs are tied up sold in rope-like clustersphoto
Bamboo hats are used as wok lids
Three mosquitoes make up a dish - mosquitoes are so large that it is said that just three are large enough to make a meal
Bamboo is used to make water pipes for smoking
Erkuai - a local culinary specialty made of rice, whose name translates literally as "ear piece" (called zi ba, 糍粑 in Mandarin)
The same dress is worn for all four seasons - clothing for all four seasons may be seen on a single day in Yunnan, as climatic conditions may vary widely according to altitude and region
Young girls are called "Old Lady"
Automobiles move faster than trains
Toes are exposed all year round
Rain here but sunshine there - the weather is often variable between areas just a few kilometers apart
Girls wear flowers in all four seasons
Girls carry tobacco bags
Green vegetables are called "bitter vegetables"
Grannies climb mountains faster than monkeys
Trains go abroad but not inland
Monks can have love affairs
Children are raised by men - Yunnan women have a reputation for being hard-working, thus many men stay home to take care of their children 
Automobiles move in the clouds - many roads are high in the mountains

The items on the list are not fixed, so other versions of the list may include other oddities, including:

Stone grows in the clouds - Yunnan's Shilin, or Stone Forest resembles stalagmites growing out of the ground
Locusts or grasshoppers are eaten as a delicacy
Fresh flowers are served as a vegetable
Water and fire are worshipped as gods
People sing rather than speak
Tea leaves are sold in piles
Non-slanting walls are built with cobblestones
Keys are hung on waist belts
Small, lean horses are hard-working
Fresh fruits and vegetables are available in all four seasons

References
Li Kunwu (李昆武, 2004). Yunnan Shiba Guai (云南十八怪; Eighteen Wonders of Yunnan Province). China: Yunnan University Press. .

External links
Eighteen Oddities in Yunnan page
Eighteen Oddities in Yunnan page
Eighteen Oddities in Yunnan page
Illustrated Eighteen Oddities in Yunnan page
Illustrated Eighteen Oddities in Yunnan page
Eighteen Oddities in Yunnan page

Culture in Yunnan